Glyphipterix gianelliella is a moth of the family Glyphipterigidae. It is found in France, Spain, Switzerland, Austria, Italy and the Caucasus.

The wingspan is about 14 mm.

References

Moths described in 1885
Glyphipterigidae
Moths of Europe